Vallecas Club de Fútbol is a Spanish football team based in Vallecas, Madrid, in the autonomous community of Madrid. Founded in 1967, it plays in Preferente, holding home games at Estadio Nuestra Señora de la Torre, which has a capacity of 2,500 spectators.

History
Vallecas was founded in 1967, spending the first four decades of its existence fluctuating between the regional championships and the national fourth division.

Season to season

7 seasons in Tercera División

Uniform
Home: White shirt, blue shorts, white socks.
Away: Red shirt, blue shorts, blue socks.

Former players
  José Freijo
   Colin Zizzi

Club information
Address: Calle Puerto de Reinosa s/n Vallecas (Madrid)
Phone: 91 331 14 86
Associates / Subscribers: 300 (approx.)

External links
Official website 
Futmadrid team profile 

Villa de Vallecas
Football clubs in Madrid
Association football clubs established in 1967
Divisiones Regionales de Fútbol clubs
1967 establishments in Spain